Francesco Conti (1681–1760) was an Italian painter.

Biography
Conti was born in Florence, Italy, and spent some time studying art in Rome. He specialized in painting religious-themed works. He studied primarily under Giovanni Maria Morandi and Carlo Maratta. In 1738 he painted one of his most renowned works Madonna and Child with St. Sylvester the Pope, St. Paul and St. Catherine of Alexandria. He continued to paint up until his death in 1760.

Among his pupils was Anna Bacherini Piattoli.

Gallery

References

1681 births
1760 deaths
17th-century Italian painters
Italian male painters
18th-century Italian painters
Painters from Florence
Pupils of Carlo Maratta
18th-century Italian male artists